Al Anad Air Base is a military air base in the Lahij Governorate, Yemen. It is the biggest air base in Yemen.

History 
The base was built by the Soviet Union during the Cold War.

The base witnessed heavy clashes during the Yemeni Civil War in 1994 as it was one of the key entry points to Aden.

The base served as a headquarters for United States intelligence-gathering and counterterrorism operations in southern Yemen until the aftermath of the 2014–15 Yemeni coup d'état, in which the Houthis took control of the Yemeni government and launched a military offensive against the remnants of the Western-backed administration in Aden. In March 2015, the U.S. withdrew its remaining special forces from the base when Al-Qaeda in the Arabian Peninsula (AQAP) briefly took over the governornate. Days later, on 25 March, the installation was taken over by Houthi fighters and the 201st Armoured Brigade of the Yemen Army. The following day, forces loyal to President Abd Rabbuh Mansur Hadi shelled the base, causing at least some Houthis to flee.

Loyalist fighters backed by Saudi and UAE ground forces retook the installation on 3 August 2015, with its rebel defenders fleeing to the nearby hills. The recapture came two weeks after the government's victory in the Battle of Aden.

On 31 January 2016 it was reported that a Tochka tactical ballistic missile fired by Houthi rebels struck the base killing dozens of Sudanese fighters and Yemeni recruits.

A Houthi drone penetrated the air base on January 10, 2019, and exploded above a podium where senior army officials were sitting. The head of Yemen Intelligence Agency and six soldiers were killed and some senior officials were injured.

A major attack occurred on August 29, 2021, when Houthis militants attacked the base with drones and ballistic missiles, killing 30 soldiers and wounding 60 more. Later the death toll increased to more than 40 killed.

References

Military installations of Yemen
Military history of Yemen
Lahij Governorate
United States–Yemen relations
Military installations of the Soviet Union in other countries
Cold War sites
Soviet Union–Yemen relations